The chief justice is Fiji's highest judicial officer. The office and its responsibilities are set out in Chapter 5 of the 2013 Constitution of Fiji. The Chief Justice is appointed by the President on the advice of the Prime Minister.

He is appointed by the President, and nominated by the Prime Minister, who is required by the Constitution to consult the Attorney-General (Section 106-1). Under the previous 1997 Constitution, the Prime Minister was required to consult with the Leader of the Opposition. The appointment is permanent, until the Chief Justice reaches the age of 75 years (Section 110-1).

Like other judges, the Chief Justice need not be a Fijian citizen.  When Sir Timoci Tuivaga retired in 2002, there were calls from the Citizens Constitutional Forum (a pro-democracy, human rights organization) for a foreigner to be appointed, to restore the independence of the judiciary that had been seen to be politically compromised by the 2000 coup.  The government, however, appointed Fijian Daniel Fatiaki. In 2007, the military-backed interim government appointed Australian citizen Anthony Gates as Acting Chief Justice; he became permanent Chief Justice on 5 December 2008.

Powers of Chief Justice
According to Chapter 5 of the 2013 Constitution, the Chief Justice sits on the High Court (Section 100) and presides over the Supreme Court (Section 98), but is barred from membership of the Court of Appeal.  This stipulation is designed to give the Appeal Court a measure of independence from the other two courts. The Chief Justice also chairs the Judicial Service Commission (Section 104(a)).

According to the 2013 Constitution, the Chief Justice is also the first in the order of succession to discharge the duties of the President of Fiji as Acting President should the President be unable to discharge her or his office or if the office becomes vacant for any reason. The 2013 Constitution also stipulates that in the absence of the Chief Justice, the next senior most substantive judge performs the  duties of the President as Acting President.

History of the office
Before 1871, when Seru Epenisa Cakobau established the first unified Kingdom of Viti under his authority, what is now Fiji was a patchwork of warring fiefdoms. Forming a government dominated by foreigners, Cakobau appointed Sir Charles St Julian, an Australian newspaper editor, as the first Chief Justice in 1872. St Julian died in office a few weeks after Cakobau ceded Fiji to the United Kingdom on 10 October 1874, under the provisions of the Pacific Islanders Protection Acts of 1872 and 1875, (amended in 1875), (long title: An Act for the Prevention and Punishment of Criminal Outrages upon Natives of the Islands in the Pacific Ocean) which sought to bring the rule of law to British subjects who were using unconventional methods to supply labour for the European-run cotton plantations in Fiji. St. Julian was followed as Chief Justice in 1875 by Sir William Hackett.

From 1877 through 1961, the Chief Justice of Fiji was ex officio Chief Justice of the High Commissioner's Court, more commonly known as the Chief Judicial Commissioner for the Western Pacific, the chief judicial officer throughout the British Western Pacific Territories, a supra-colonial entity established by the Western Pacific Orders-in-Council 1877 (amended in 1879 and 1880), and by the Pacific Order-in-Council 1893. Appeals lay to the Privy Council in London. From 1942 to 1945 the High Commission was suspended by military administration during the War in the Pacific. Headed by a High Commissioner for the Western Pacific, who was also ex officio the Governor of Fiji, until the end of 1952, it included numerous islands, mostly small, throughout Oceania. Composition varied over time, but Fiji (1877-1952) and the Solomon Islands (1893-1976) were its most durable members.

From the beginning of 1953, Fiji and Tonga were separated from the High Commission as a prelude to full independence, and the High Commission offices were transferred to Honiara on Guadalcanal in the Solomon Islands. The office of High Commissioner was separated from that of the Governor of Fiji and was now held by the Governor of the Solomon Islands). The High Commissioner's Court, however, continued to sit in Suva, and the Chief Justice of Fiji remained the Chief Judicial Commissioner of the Western Pacific until 1962.

From 1962 onwards, functions of the High Commissioner's Court began to be transferred to the increasingly independent island states under the provisions of Western Pacific (Courts) Order in Council, 1961. The Judicial Commissioner for the Western Pacific became the Chief Justice of the High Court of the Western Pacific, and removed from Fiji to join the rest of the British High Commission in the Solomon Islands. The position was separated from that of the Chief Justice of Fiji.

Fiji gained independence on 10 October 1970. Although no longer connected with the British High Commission, the position of Chief Justice of Fiji continued to be filled by judges from Britain, Australia and New Zealand until the appointment of Sir Timoci Tuivaga in 1980.

The constitutional arrangements relating to the Chief Justice were temporarily overturned in 2000, following a counter-coup by Commodore Frank Bainimarama to neutralize a civilian coup d'état instigated by George Speight.  The then-Chief Justice, Sir Timoci Tuivaga recognized the Interim Military Government that took office and abrogated the Constitution on 29 May, and drafted the controversial Administration of Justice Decree that was immediately promulgated by the military administration.  This decree abolished the Supreme Court, made the Chief Justice head of the Appeal Court, and raised the retirement age of the Chief Justice from 70 years to 75.  These changes were reversed following a decision of the High Court to reinstate the Constitution on 15 November 2000, a decision upheld by the Appeal Court on 1 March 2001.

Current Chief Justice
Kamal Kumar is the acting Chief Justice. Anthony Gates has retired in March 2019, who succeeded Daniel Fatiaki following the military coup that deposed the Qarase government on 5 December 2006, when Commodore Josaia Voreqe (Frank) Bainimarama, the Commander of the Republic of Fiji Military Forces and Acting President of Fiji, sent Fatiaki on leave.   The military regime named him as Acting Chief Justice on 3 January 2007, and installed him as the substantive Chief Justice on 5 December 2008.

List of Chief Justices of Fiji

References
Notes

Citations

Sources
 

 

 

  (D. Phil. dissertation)

Further reading
 Library Resources for Pacific History, University of Auckland Library
  Duff, Peter (1997) The evolution of trial by judge and assessors in Fiji Care, Jennifer Corrin (ed.) Journal of Pacific Studies Volume 21: Sources of Law in the South Pacific.
 Handley, K.R. (2001) The constitutional crisis in Fiji. The Australian Law Journal, Volume 75, November 2001, pp. 688–693.

Judiciary of Fiji
Fiji
 
Chief Justice